Duke of Maqueda is a hereditary title in the Peerage of Spain, accompanied by the dignity of Grandee and granted in 1529 by Charles I to Diego de Cárdenas, 2nd Lord of Maqueda and adelantado of the Kingdom of Granada.

The title makes reference to the town of Maqueda in Toledo.

Dukes of Maqueda (1529)

Diego de Cárdenas y Enríquez, 1st Duke of Maqueda
Bernardino de Cárdenas y Pacheco, 2nd Duke of Maqueda
Bernardino de Cárdenas y Portugal, 3rd Duke of Maqueda
Jorge de Cárdenas y Manrique de Lara, 4th Duke of Maqueda
Jaime Manuel de Cárdenas y Manrique de Lara, 5th Duke of Maqueda
Francisco María de Monserrat Manrique de Cárdenas, 6th Duke of Maqueda
Teresa Antonia Manrique de Mendoza, 7th Duchess of Maqueda
Raimundo de Láncaster y Manrique, 8th Duke of Maqueda
María Guadalupe de Láncaster y Manrique, 9th Duchess of Maqueda
Manuel Ponce de León y Láncaster, 10th Duke of Maqueda
Joaquín Cayetano Ponce de León y Spínola, 11th Duke of Maqueda
Manuel Ponce de León y Spínola, 12th Duke of Maqueda
Francisco Ponce de León y Spínola, 13th Duke of Maqueda
Antonio Ponce de León y Spínola, 14th Duke of Maqueda
Vicente Joaquín Osorio de Moscoso y Guzmán, 15th Duke of Maqueda 
Vicente Isabel Osorio de Moscoso y Álvarez de Toledo, 16th Duke of Maqueda
Vicente Pío Osorio de Moscoso y Ponce de León, 17th Duke of Maqueda
José María Osorio de Moscoso y Carvajal, 18th Duke of Maqueda
Francisco de Asís Osorio de Moscoso y de Borbón, 19th Duke of Maqueda
Francisco de Asís Osorio de Moscoso y Jordán de Urríes, 20th Duke of Maqueda
María del Perpetuo Socorro Osorio de Moscoso y Reynoso, 21st Duchess of Maqueda
María Dolores Barón y Osorio de Moscoso, 22nd Duchess of Maqueda
Luis María Gonzaga de Casanova-Cárdenas y Barón, 23rd Duke of Maqueda
María del Pilar Paloma de Casanova-Cárdenas y Barón, 24th Duchess of Maqueda

See also
List of dukes in the peerage of Spain
List of current Grandees of Spain

References 

Dukedoms of Spain
Grandees of Spain
Lists of dukes
Lists of Spanish nobility